Events in the year 2023 in Kosovo.

Incumbents 

 President: Vjosa Osmani
 Prime Minister: Albin Kurti

Events 
Ongoing — COVID-19 pandemic in Kosovo

January–June 

 8 January – NATO rejects Serbia's request to deploy up to 1,000 of Serbia's troops and military police in North Kosovo.

See also 

 2023 in Europe
 COVID-19 pandemic in Europe

References 

 
Kosovo
Kosovo
2020s in Kosovo
Years of the 21st century in Kosovo